The 1939–40 Taça de Portugal was the second season of the Taça de Portugal (English: Portuguese Cup), the premier Portuguese football knockout competition, organized by the Portuguese Football Federation (FPF). Académica de Coimbra was the defending champion but lost in the first round to Boavista. The final was played on 7 July 1940 between S.L. Benfica and Belenenses.

Participating Teams

Primeira Divisão 
(10 Teams)
Associação Académica de Coimbra – Organismo Autónomo de Futebol
Académico Futebol Clube "do Porto"
Futebol Clube Barreirense
Clube de Futebol Os Belenenses
Sport Lisboa e Benfica
Carcavelinhos Football Club
Leixões Sport Club
Futebol Clube do Porto
Sporting Clube de Portugal
Vitória Futebol Clube "de Setúbal"

Segunda Divisão 
(4 Teams)
Casa Pia Atlético Clube
Boavista Futebol Clube
Sporting Clube Farense
Sporting Clube da Covilhã

Madeira Championship 
(1 Team)
Clube Sport Marítimo

First round
In this round entered the teams from Primeira Divisão (1st level) and Segunda Divisão (2nd level).

Results

|}

Quarterfinals
In this round entered the winner from Madeira Championship and the winners of the previous round.

Results

|}

Semifinals

Results

|}

Semifinal play-off

Final

References

External links
Official webpage 
1939–40 Taça de Portugal at zerozero.pt 

1939-40
Port
Taca